The 1973–74 Japan Ice Hockey League season was the eighth season of the Japan Ice Hockey League. Five teams participated in the league, and the Oji Seishi Hockey won the championship.

Regular season

External links
 Japan Ice Hockey Federation

Japan
Japan Ice Hockey League seasons
Japan